Solid Earth is a peer-reviewed open-access scientific journal covering Earth science, more specifically the solid Earth aspects. It was established in 2010 and is published by Copernicus Publications for the European Geosciences Union.

Abstracting and indexing 
The journal is abstracted and indexed in:

According to the Journal Citation Reports, the journal has a 2015 impact factor of 2.083.

References

External links

Earth and atmospheric sciences journals
Publications established in 2010
English-language journals
Creative Commons Attribution-licensed journals
European Geosciences Union academic journals
Copernicus Publications academic journals